Edward Ash Hadow (18 April 1831 – 11 August 1866) was an English Chemist.

Edward Ash Hadow was born in Clifton, Bristol.

He attended Bristol medical school and subsequently the University of London.  He achieved a diploma of the Royal College of surgeons and a bachelor of medicine.  At Kings College, London, he won a Daniell Scholarship following an essay on gun-cotton.

Career 
Hadow became demonstrator of chemistry at King’s College and studied the detection of alum in bread.  His research also examined the action of oxidizing agents on the sulphocyanides and the method of converting them into cyanides and the composition of the platinicyanides.

Hadow also invented a process for producing "soluble cotton", involved in early photography  This formula is described in the Photographic Journal.

Parents
He was the son of George John Hadow (1789–1869) of the Madras Civil Service and later of Sundon House, Clifton and Margaret Julia Timins (1796–1875) and grandson of Reverend James Hadow of Streatley, Bedfordshire.

Personal life 
In 1865, Hadow married Mary Ann Robinson.
On 11 August 1866, Hadow died of pneumonia. Hadow was 35.

Publications
"Notes on the action of oxidising agents on sulphocyanides" Q. J. Chem. Soc., 1859, 11, 174 - 180
"The Platinum bases" Journal of the Chemical Society: Transactions, Volume 4; Volume 19

He was joint editor of Hardwich’s Manual of Photography.

Further reading
Royal Society of Chemistry Anniversary Meeting, March 30, 1867; page 385.

References

1831 births
1866 deaths
British chemists
Alumni of the University of London
Deaths from pneumonia in the United Kingdom